XHERIO-FM is a radio station on 106.9 FM in Ixtlán del Río, Nayarit. XHERIO is owned by Radiorama and carries a grupera format known as Radio Sensación.

History
XHERIO began as XERIO-AM 1560, awarded in 1976 to José de Jesús Cortés de Barbosa. It was later sold to Radio Rio, S.A. de C.V.

In 2005, XERIO moved to 1050 kHz, and in 2010, it migrated to FM on 106.9 MHz.

References

Radio stations in Nayarit